PEPPSI is an abbreviation for pyridine-enhanced precatalyst preparation stabilization and initiation. It refers to a family of commercially available palladium catalysts developed around 2005 by Prof. Michael G. Organ and co-workers at York University, which can accelerate various carbon-carbon and carbon-heteroatom bond forming cross-coupling reactions. In comparison to many alternative palladium catalysts, Pd-PEPPSI-type complexes are stable to air and moisture and are relatively easy to synthesize and handle.

Structure and synthesis
In the basic structure of  Pd-PEPPSI, R1 can be a methyl (CH3, Me), ethyl (C2H5, Et), isopropyl (C3H7, iPr), isopentyl (C5H11, iPent), or isoheptyl (C7H15, iHept) group, and the resulting catalysts are thus labeled as PEPPSI-IMes, PEPPSI-IEt, PEPPSI-IPr, PEPPSI-IPent, and PEPPSI-IHept respectively, with or without "Pd-" added in front. Commonly used PEPPSI catalysts such as Pd-PEPPSI-IPr contain an unsubstituted imidazole core (R2=H) and a 3-chloro substituted pyridine ligand (R3=3-Cl). However, structural modifications of the imidazole backbone and pyridine ligand can profoundly affect the catalytic activity of these complexes.

The synthesis and structure of Pd-PEPPSI catalysts were presented in 2005 and published in 2006. PEPPSI catalysts are organopalladium complexes containing N-heterocyclic carbene (NHC) ligands. They can be obtained by reacting an imidazolium salt, palladium(II) chloride, and potassium carbonate in 3-chloropyridine as a solvent, under vigorous stirring at 80 °C for 16 hours in air. The yield of PEPPSI in this reaction is 97–98%. Contrary to other common palladium-based catalysts, such as tetrakis(triphenylphosphine)palladium(0), PEPPSI is stable to exposure to air and moisture. Even heating in dimethyl sulfoxide at 120 °C for hours does not result in significant decomposition or deactivation of PEPPSI catalysts.

iPEPPSI
Examples of abnormal NHCs based on the mesoionic 1,2,3-triazol-5-ylidene structure have been used for palladium catalysis. In this manner, pyridine fused tzNHCs were prepared to yield palladium complexes with pyridine attached to the carbene core. With this ligand, air stable and highly active palladium complexes of iPEPPSI (as in internal PEPPSI) were synthesized.

Properties and applications
PEPPSI can catalyze various palladium cross-coupling reactions including Negishi coupling, Suzuki coupling, Sonogashira coupling, Kumada coupling, and the Buchwald–Hartwig amination as well as aryl sulfination and the Heck reaction. In Negishi coupling, PEPPSI promotes reaction of alkyl halides, aryl halides or alkyl sulfonates with alkylzinc halides, and the important advantage of PEPPSI over alternative catalysts is that the reaction can be carried out in a general chemical laboratory, without a glove box. PEPPSI contains palladium in the +2 oxidation state and is thus a "precatalyst", that is the metal must be reduced to the active Pd(0) form in order to enter the cross-coupling catalytic cycle. This is usually achieved in situ in the presence of active transmetalating agents such as organo-magnesium, -zinc, -tin, or -boron reagents. Once activated, the NHC-Pd(0) species becomes rather air-sensitive.

An efficient, cationic palladium catalyst of iPEPPSI (internal PEPPSI) type was demonstrated to efficiently catalyse the copper-free Sonogashira reaction in water as the only solvent, under aerobic conditions, in the absence of copper, amines, phosphines and other additives.

Additionally, the cationic palladium iPEPPSI complex shown above was used in the hydroamination of alkynes as well. The authors have demonstrated that the ligands actively participate in the reaction mechanism since the pyridine group acts as an internal base to enable the intramolecular proton transfer between active sites of intermediates.

References

External links
PEPPSI homepage at Prof. Michael G. Organ's research group

Catalysts
Organopalladium compounds